Kevin Ingram (born 1977) is an American retired football player.

Kevin Ingram may also refer to:

 Kevin Ingram (quarterback) (born 1962), American football quarterback
 Kevin Ingram (bond trader), former bond trader and felon